"Here Come the Hawks!" is the official fight song and introduction of the Chicago Blackhawks. The song was written by J. Swayzee and produced by the Dick Marx Orchestra and Choir in 1968. It is still played today during the pre-game video. An abbreviated rendition is also played following the end of each period on an organ. During games in November 2008, a video of current players singing the song (rather poorly in most cases) was shown during the second intermission.

External links
Original vocal recording of "Here Come The Hawks" on the Chicago Blackhawks website.
Original instrumental recording of "Here Come The Hawks" on the Chicago Blackhawks website.

Chicago Blackhawks
National Hockey League fight songs
1968 songs
Songs about Chicago